Saulea is a genus of freshwater snails with an operculum, aquatic gastropod mollusks in the family Ampullariidae, the apple snails.

Saulea is the type genus of the tribe Sauleini.

The genus Saulea is known from Africa.

Species
There are two species within the genus Saulea:
 † Saulea lithoides (Pain & Beatty, 1964) - in East Africa
 Saulea vitrea (Born, 1780) - type species - in West Africa

References

Ampullariidae